Chris Doyle may refer to:

 Chris Doyle (artist) (born 1971), American multi-media artist
 Chris Doyle (footballer) (born 1995), English footballer who plays for Morecambe
 Christopher Doyle (born 1952), Australian cinematographer 
 Chris Doyle (American football) (born 1968), American football coach